Shampoo is  a soap-based liquid or solid used for washing hair. 

Shampoo may also refer to:

Arts, entertainment, and media
Shampoo (duo), a British singing duo
Shampoo (film), a 1975 film directed by Hal Ashby, starring Warren Beatty
Shampoo (parody band) a short-lived Beatles tribute/parody band from Italy
Shampoo (Ranma ½), a Joketsuzoku warrior character from the Ranma ½ manga series
"Shampoo" (song), by Benjamin Ingrosso

Other uses
Shampoo (massage), a traditional Indian and Persian body massage
Shampooing, in auto detailing, is the degreasing and cleaning of a vehicle

See also